Sean Kieran Conlon (born 20 May 1981) is an English singer best known as a member of boy band Five before leaving in 2001 a few months before the group announced their split. Conlon rejoined the group in 2013 as part of the ITV2 series The Big Reunion.

Early life
Conlon was born in Leeds, West Yorkshire, of Irish and Trinidadian descent and has four siblings. He grew up in Horsforth and attended St Mary's RC Primary School and St. Mary's Catholic High School, Menston. As a child his interests lay in becoming a record producer of soul music or playing rugby. He had his very first recording session aged eleven and, at the age of thirteen, performed for Harvey Goldsmith, Richard Skinner and Phil Collins after winning Yamaha's Young Composer Competition. Shortly after, Conlon's father, actor Dennis Conlon, (the Chief in Shameless) contacted Bob Herbert and asked him to consider Sean. Sean was initially refused due to being only 15 years old but, as he was the only boy out of 3,000 applicants that played his own composition at the audition, Simon Cowell said "Yes".

Career
Whilst a member of Five, Conlon received schooling from a home tutor for the first month of his pop career but couldn't continue due to the heavy schedule.

When it was time to begin filming the video for "Let's Dance", the first single from Five's third album, Kingsize, Conlon was unable to appear as he was suffering from a mental breakdown from stress caused by being part of the group. This was not publicly revealed at the time, however, and it was claimed he was ill from glandular fever instead. The "Let's Dance" video was released with a life-size cardboard cut-out of Sean standing in for him, and rumours that he had in fact left the band had to be quashed. Conlon later admitted that having originally been "very confident and very outgoing" when the band started, he "became the insecure one" and "let the external environment destroy [him]".

After Five disbanded in late 2001, Conlon began been pursuing a solo career as an R&B, jazz and soul singer and pianist in the cafés of London, and was signed to a recording contract. It was this that made him decide not to be part of Five's ultimately unsuccessful comeback in 2006. He ultimately became the second group member to sign a solo recording deal, with Sony, and began work on a new album. Soon after work on the album had begun however, he was dropped by the label.

Conlon co-wrote the Boyzone song "Let Your Wall Fall Down" for their fourth studio album Brother, released in 2011.

In March 2012, Conlon auditioned for the first series of The Voice UK, but he did not make it through to the next round as no coach chose him. Following this, Conlon reunited with his former bandmates to discuss the possibility of a second reunion. In October, it was announced that Five were reuniting for a second time, and that Conlon would be taking part this time.

Personal life
In Five's earlier days, Conlon was briefly engaged to dancer Suzanne Mole, who toured with the group. He is now married to a woman who prefers to remain anonymous. On 15 January 2014, it was announced that they were expecting their first child "any time soon". The following week, they welcomed their first child, a daughter.

References

External links
 Biography on Sean Conlon — retrieved 10 January 2006

1981 births
Living people
English people of Irish descent
English people of Trinidad and Tobago descent
21st-century Black British male singers
20th-century Black British male singers
Five (band) members
Musicians from Leeds
People educated at St. Mary's Catholic High School, Menston
The Voice UK contestants
People from Horsforth